Yeny Contreras Loyola (born August 2, 1979) is a Chilean taekwondo practitioner. At the 2012 Summer Olympics, she competed in the Women's 57kg Taekwondo event, but was defeated in the first round.

References

1979 births
Living people
Olympic taekwondo practitioners of Chile
Taekwondo practitioners at the 2012 Summer Olympics
Chilean female taekwondo practitioners
Pan American Games bronze medalists for Chile
Pan American Games medalists in taekwondo
South American Games gold medalists for Chile
South American Games medalists in taekwondo
Taekwondo practitioners at the 2011 Pan American Games
Competitors at the 2010 South American Games
Medalists at the 2011 Pan American Games
20th-century Chilean women
21st-century Chilean women